Monechma is a genus of plants in the family Acanthaceae, closely related to the genus Justicia.

Species
Monechma acutum C.B.Clarke
Monechma affine Hochst.
Monechma angustifolium Nees
Monechma angustissimum S.Moore
Monechma arenicola C.B.Clarke
Monechma atherstonei C.B.Clarke
Monechma australe P.G.Mey.
Monechma bracteatum Hochst.
Monechma calcaratum Schinz
Monechma callothamnum J.Munday
Monechma carrissoi Benoist
Monechma ciliatum (Jacq.) Milne-Redh.
Monechma clarkei Schinz
Monechma cleomoides C.B.Clarke
Monechma crassiusculum P.G.Mey.
Monechma debile (Forssk.) Nees
Monechma depauperatum C.B.Clarke
Monechma desertorum C.B.Clarke
Monechma distichotrichum (Lindau) P.G.Mey.
Monechma divaricatum (Nees) C.B. Clarke
Monechma eremum S.Moore
Monechma fimbriatum C.B.Clarke
Monechma floridum C.B.Clarke
Monechma foliosum C.B.Clarke
Monechma genistifolium C.B.Clarke
Monechma glaucifolium S.Moore
Monechma grandiflorum Schinz
Monechma hereroense C.B.Clarke
Monechma hispidum Hochst.
Monechma incanum C.B.Clarke
Monechma leucoderme (Schinz) C.B.Clarke
Monechma linaria C.B.Clarke
Monechma loliaceum K.Schum.
Monechma lolioides C.B.Clarke
Monechma marginatum C.B.Clarke
Monechma molle C.B.Clarke
Monechma mollissimum (Nees) P.G.Mey.
Monechma monechmoides (S.Moore) Hutch.
Monechma namaense C.B.Clarke
Monechma ndellense (Lindau) Miege & Heine
Monechma nepeta C.B.Clarke
Monechma nepetoides C.B.Clarke
Monechma pilosella Nees
Monechma platysepalum S.Moore
Monechma praecox Milne-Redh.
Monechma pseudopatulum C.B.Clarke
Monechma quintasii Benoist
Monechma rigidum S.Moore
Monechma robustum Bond
Monechma salsola C.B.Clarke
Monechma saxatile J.Munday
Monechma scabridum C.B.Clarke
Monechma scabrinerve C.B.Clarke
Monechma serotinum P.G.Mey.
Monechma spartioides C.B.Clarke
Monechma spissum C.B.Clarke
Monechma subsessile (Oliv.) C.B. Clarke
Monechma terminale S.Moore
Monechma tettense C.B.Clarke
Monechma tonsum P.G.Mey.
Monechma troglodytica Chiov.
Monechma ukambense C.B.Clarke
Monechma varians C.B.Clarke
Monechma violaceum Nees
Monechma virgultorum S.Moore
Monechma welwitschii C.B.Clarke

Acanthaceae
Acanthaceae genera
Taxonomy articles created by Polbot